The Watarru Indigenous Protected Area is an Indigenous Protected Area in the north west corner of South Australia. It is the traditional land of the Pitjantjatjara, Ngaanyatjarra and Yankunytjatjara peoples.

The area was made an Indigenous Protected Area in June 2000. It is managed by the Watarru community according to their traditional laws and practices, known as Tjukurpa. The environment has not been damaged by cattle grazing or other farming practices. The Anangu are working with scientists to develop ways of dealing with feral animals including cats, foxes and camels.
It is classified as an IUCN Category II protected area.

See also
 Protected areas of Australia

References

External links
Webpage for Watarru Indigenous Protected Area on the Protected Planet website
Agreements, Treaties and Negotiated Settlements Project profile for Watarru Indigenous Protected Area

 Indigenous protected areas in South Australia
2000 establishments in Australia
Protected areas established in 2000
Anangu Pitjantjatjara Yankunytjatjara
Great Victoria Desert